Alexandru Dan (26 July 1907 – 2007) was a Romanian gymnast. He competed in eight events at the 1936 Summer Olympics.

References

1907 births
2007 deaths
Romanian male artistic gymnasts
Olympic gymnasts of Romania
Gymnasts at the 1936 Summer Olympics
Place of birth missing